In enzymology, a 2-hydroxy-1,4-benzoquinone reductase is an enzyme that catalyzes the chemical reaction

2-hydroxy-1,4-benzoquinone + NADH + H+  1,2,4-trihydroxybenzene + NAD+

The 3 substrates of this enzyme are 2-hydroxy-1,4-benzoquinone, NADH, and H+, whereas its two products are 1,2,4-trihydroxybenzene and NAD+.

This enzyme participates in gamma-hexachlorocyclohexane degradation and 1,4-dichlorobenzene degradation.

Nomenclature 

This enzyme belongs to the family of oxidoreductases, specifically those acting on NADH or NADPH with a quinone or similar compound as acceptor.  The systematic name of this enzyme class is 2-hydroxy-1,4-benzoquinone:NADH oxidoreductase. Other names in common use include hydroxybenzoquinone reductase, 1,2,4-trihydroxybenzene:NAD oxidoreductase, and NADH:2-hydroxy-1,4-benzoquinone oxidoreductase.

References

 

EC 1.6.5
NADPH-dependent enzymes
NADH-dependent enzymes
Enzymes of unknown structure